Krymske may refer to the following places in Ukraine:

Krymske, Crimea, village in Saky Raion
Krymske, Donetsk Oblast, settlement in Bakhmut Raion
Krymske, Luhansk Oblast, village in Shchastia Raion